The 2022 President's Cup was the eight President's Cup contested for. The match was played on 11 February between the champions of the 2021 League of Ireland Premier Division and the 2021 FAI Cup winners, Shamrock Rovers and St Patrick's Athletic.

Match

Summary
St Patrick's Athletic had the better of the chances with Eoin Doyle and Mark Doyle both missing two good chances in the first half before Eoin Doyle opened the scoring in the 50th minute, finishing from 5 yards after Shamrock Rovers goalkeeper Alan Mannus parried Jamie Lennon's volley. The home side were level in the 67th minute when Ronan Finn capitalised on a goalkeeping error from Pat's debutant Joseph Anang who spilled a cross straight into the path of Rovers captain.
The score remained level after 90 minutes and Chris Forrester had his penalty saved by Mannus in the shootout to seal the trophy for the home side after all other penalties for both sides were scored.

Details

See also
 2022 League of Ireland Premier Division
 2022 FAI Cup
 2022 St Patrick's Athletic F.C. season

References

President of Ireland's Cup
2
President Of Ireland's Cup 2022